Brierfield railway station serves the town of Brierfield, Lancashire, England and is on the East Lancashire Line  east of Burnley Central railway station towards Colne (the terminus). The station is managed by Northern, who also provide all passenger trains serving it.

The station is unstaffed and only has basic facilities (no waiting room, just a shelter and a modern ticket vending machine), though there are passenger information screens, timetable posters and a long-line PA system in place to provide train running information. The platform has step-free access from the adjoining street.

History

The line through the station has been single track since December 1986, but the double track-bed and the disused down platform are still in place, as is the old station building (though this is now privately owned).

The signal box (which was built in 1876 and latterly only operated the adjacent level crossing) was abolished and dismantled in September 2014, when the crossing was converted to automatic operation under the remote supervision of Preston PSB.  The box structure has been donated to a local arts organisation (In-Situ) and is to be rebuilt nearby at Brierfield Mills.

There is an active Rail user Group based here - "The Friends of Brierfield Station"

Services

Monday to Saturdays, there is an hourly service from Brierfield towards Burnley Central, Accrington, Blackburn and Preston westbound and Colne, eastbound.

References

External links

Brierfield, Lancashire
Railway stations in the Borough of Pendle
DfT Category F2 stations
Former Lancashire and Yorkshire Railway stations
Railway stations in Great Britain opened in 1849
Northern franchise railway stations
1849 establishments in England